Sosineura mimica is a species of moth of the Carposinidae family. It is found in  Australia, including Tasmania.

References

Carposinidae